Sandeep Sejwal (born 23 January 1989) is an Indian swimmer who has participated in Olympics 2008. He contested in the men's 100 m and 200 m breaststroke events at the 2010 Asian Juniors in Beijing, but  did not reach the finals in both events. He won the bronze medal in 2014 Asian Games in 50 m breaststroke.

Career
Sandeep is the Senior National Champion and Indian National Record-holder in the 50 m, 100 m and 200 m Breaststroke events. He won silver medals at the Asian Indoor Games, 2007 in the 50 m and 100 m Breaststroke events.

Sandeep won bronze medal in 50m breaststroke event at the 2014 Asian Games.

He won two gold medals in the 100m, and 200m breaststroke at the 2010 South Asian Games.

He won three gold medals in the 50m,100m, and 200m breaststroke at the 2016 South Asian Games.

He won gold medal with a new national record in 50m breaststroke at the 14th Singapore National Swimming Championships, 2018.

He finished 7th in the finals of 50m breaststroke at the 2018 Asian Games.

He is coached by Nihar Ameen in Bangalore. He is supported by the GoSports Foundation, a sports non profit organisation that aims to promote sporting excellence in India.

Television

Awards
Sandeep was awarded the Arjuna award by government of India by then president Pranab Mukherjee.

Personal life
Sejwal married  TV actress Pooja Banerjee on 28 February 2017. The couple had their first child, a baby girl named Sana on 12 March 2022.

Sandeep is an undergraduate student at St. Stephen's College, Delhi.

References

External links
Sandeep's homepage

1989 births
Living people
Indian male swimmers
Indian male breaststroke swimmers
Indian male backstroke swimmers
Indian male freestyle swimmers
Swimmers from Delhi
Swimmers at the 2008 Summer Olympics
Olympic swimmers of India
Recipients of the Arjuna Award
Asian Games medalists in swimming
Swimmers at the 2010 Asian Games
Swimmers at the 2014 Asian Games
Swimmers at the 2018 Asian Games
Asian Games bronze medalists for India
Medalists at the 2014 Asian Games
South Asian Games gold medalists for India
South Asian Games silver medalists for India
South Asian Games bronze medalists for India
South Asian Games medalists in swimming
St. Stephen's College, Delhi alumni
20th-century Indian people
21st-century Indian people